Retalhuleu is a department located in the south-west of Guatemala, extending from the mountains to the Pacific Ocean coast.  It has an area of 1856 km2.  In 2018 the population of the Department of Retalhuleu was 326,828. Its capital, Retalhuleu City, mixes ancient and modern architecture, and it is also known for being a commercial city.

The largest Native American group in the state is the K'iche' (Quiché) Maya people.  The department contains a number of Pre-Columbian ruins, including Takalik Abaj, and it also contains numerous amusement parks, the most important and known are Xetulul and Xocomil.

Municipalities 

The department is divided into nine municipalities:

 Champerico
 El Asintal
 Nuevo San Carlos
 Retalhuleu
 San Andrés Villa Seca
 San Felipe
 San Martín Zapotitlán
 San Sebastián
 Santa Cruz Muluá

Geography
Tropical savanna climates have monthly mean temperature above 18 °C (64 °F) in every month of the year and typically a pronounced dry season, with the driest month having precipitation less than 60mm (2.36 in) of precipitation.  The Köppen Climate Classification subtype for this climate is "Aw". (Tropical Savanna Climate).

Climate

References

 
Departments of Guatemala